Quail Hill is a village in the southern part of Irvine, Orange County, California. It is one of the seven communities that belong to the University area of the City of Irvine. The village's name comes from a distinctive rock formation that adjoins  of open space.
Located next to the  405 freeway, Quail Hill is close to major employment, entertainment and dining areas of the city.
At the foot of Quail Hill there is the Quail Hill Loop Trail that provides public access to a natural surface trail.

Neighborhoods

Single Family
 Sage by California Pacific Homes (Cluster Courtyard) with Robert Hidey Architects
 Vicara by Richmond American Homes - with Robert Hidey Architects
 Linden by William Lyon Homes
 Laurel by William Lyon Homes
 Olivos by California Pacific Homes - with Robert Hidey Architects
 Tapestry by Fieldstone Communities
 Chantilly by Warmington Homes - with Bassenian-Lagoni Architects
 Sienna by Standard Pacific Homes - with Robert Hidey Architects
 Sandalwood by Standard Pacific Homes (Paired and Detached)
 Solstice by Pulte Homes

Townhomes
 Jasmine by Shea Homes - with William Hezmalhalch Architects
 Casalon by John Laing Homes
 Ivy Wreath by D.R. Horton
 Ambridge by William Lyon Homes

References 

Villages of Irvine, California